Macrognathism is an abnormally large or protruding jaw. The opposite condition is called micrognathia.


Causes
 Heredity
 Pituitary gigantism
 Paget's disease of bone
 Acromegaly
 Fetal alcohol syndrome
 Leontiasis ossea
 Cleidocranial dysplasia

Treatment
Treatment is surgical. Osteotomy may be done in case of maxillary macrognathia. Mandibular macrognathia is generally managed by resection of a portion of the mandible.

References

Human head and neck
Symptoms and signs: musculoskeletal system
Congenital disorders of musculoskeletal system